The WISE Campaign (Women into Science and Engineering) is a United Kingdom-based organization that encourages women and girls to value and pursue science, technology, engineering and maths-related courses in school or college and to move on into related careers and progress. Its mission statement aims to facilitate understanding of these disciplines among women and girls and the opportunities which they present at a professional level. It is operated by UKRC trading as WISE (company number 07533934).

Formation
The campaign began on 17 January 1984, headed by The Baroness Platt of Writtle, a qualified mechanical engineer, at which time women made up 7% of graduate engineers and 3% of professional engineers in the UK.  It was a collaboration between the Engineering Council and the Equal Opportunities Commission, originally viewed as a one-year campaign "Women into Science and Engineering" WISE'84.

Activities
One of WISE's main objectives is to listen to students and women qualified or working in these sectors, and understand and voice their opinions to academic institutions, policy-makers and employers.  It then works creatively with delivery agencies and others, offering models, tools and approaches to support them in challenging traditional approaches, so as to demonstrate equitable involvement.  WISE combats gender stereotypes to get more girls and women involved in careers where female participation was once considered near impossible.

WISE operates throughout the UK, with specialist committees in Wales, Northern Ireland and Scotland.  Volunteers, from industry and relevant organisations, attend the various WISE committee meetings, and undertake projects with WISE.

In 2011 the UKRC - an organisation specialising in gender equality in science, engineering and technology - became part of WISE.  Trudy Norris-Grey, the Chair of UKRC since 2007 then became Chair of WISE.  WISE counts The Princess Royal, Dame Julia Higgins, Kate Bellingham and Joanna Kennedy as its patrons. The Founding Chair and Patron The Baroness Platt of Writtle died on 1 February 2015, aged 91.

Young Professionals' Board

The WISE Campaign has an advisory Board to the main Board called the WISE Young Professionals' Board, formerly the WISE Young Women's Board, with a mandate to act as a sounding board to the WISE Campaign and promote the visibility of young women in STEM.

Notable members and former members include:
 Jess Wade was a Young Professionals' Board member 2015-2018 and is a campaigner for Women in STEM and promoting early career researchers.

Structure
It is headquartered at Leeds College of Building, though has been based at the UKRC (UK Resource Centre for Women in Science, Engineering, and Technology) in Bradford.

References

External links
  of WISE Campaign
 UK Parliament Business, Innovation and Skills Committee: Written evidence submitted by the Women into Science and Engineering (WISE) Campaign 11 Oct 2012
 Ingenia March 2010, issue 42 pp 48–50 "Engaging girls in engineering"

1984 establishments in the United Kingdom
Educational organisations based in the United Kingdom
Organisations based in Bradford
Organisations based in Leeds
Organizations established in 1984
Organizations for women in science and technology
Science and technology in West Yorkshire
Women in the United Kingdom
Women in engineering
Women scientists